The 2003–04 Welsh Alliance League is the 20th season of the Welsh Alliance League, which is in the third level of the Welsh football pyramid.

The league consists of sixteen teams and concluded with Rhyl Reserves as champions. Runners-up, Llandyrnog United were promoted to the Cymru Alliance.

Teams
Glantraeth were champions in the previous season and were promoted to the Cymru Alliance. They were replaced by Gwynedd League champions Llanrug United and Clwyd League runners-up, Llandyrnog United.

Grounds and locations

League table

References

External links
Welsh Alliance League

Welsh Alliance League seasons
3
Wales